Hemipristis curvatus is an extinct species of weasel shark which existed during the Eocene epoch. It was described by Dames in 1883.

References

Hemipristis
Eocene sharks
Fossils of Poland
Fossils of Mexico
Fish described in 1879